Henry Brimm (January 1, 1922 – February 21, 1994) was an American boxer. Born in Santurse, Puerto Rico, his family relocated to Buffalo, New York when Brimm was 5 years old., Brimm finished his career with a 26–17–4 record. The highlight of Brimm's career occurred in 1949 when he managed a draw against Hall of Famer Sugar Ray Robinson—Robinson finished his career 173–19–2, and was 90–1–1 when he fought Brimm.

References

External links

1922 births
1994 deaths
American male boxers